Scyphostachys is a genus of flowering plants belonging to the family Rubiaceae.

Its native range is Sri Lanka.

Species:

Scyphostachys coffeoides 
Scyphostachys pedunculatus

References

Rubiaceae
Rubiaceae genera